Dolichopus sincerus is a species of long-legged fly in the family Dolichopodidae.

References

sincerus
Articles created by Qbugbot
Insects described in 1900
Taxa named by Axel Leonard Melander